Island Lake is an unincorporated community in Beltrami County, in the U.S. state of Minnesota.

History
A post office called Island Lake was established in 1906, and remained in operation until it was discontinued in 1922. The community took its name from nearby Island Lake.

References

Former municipalities in Minnesota
Unincorporated communities in Beltrami County, Minnesota
Unincorporated communities in Minnesota